Plaza Lama is one of the main department store and supermarket chains of the Dominican Republic. The business is managed by Mario Lama Handal and his children. He owns several businesses: Plaza Lama, SuperLama, ElectroLama, Comercial Fila, SGN (Soluciones en Gas Natural) and more.

Origins 
The Lama company was founded in 1929 in San Pedro de Macorís by Pedro Juan Lama, and his wife, Afife Handal, both palestinian immigrants to the Dominican Republic. It was relocated to Avenue Duarte in Santo Domingo in the 1940s. Mario Lama Handal founded Plaza Lama and expanded his shoe business into a department store. As time went on, further department stores were opened in the city and in La Romana and Santiago.

Present day
The Plaza Lama group now runs department stores, ElectroLama electrical goods stores, Súper Lama supermarkets, wholesale distribution, two television channels, and supply of consumer essentials, vehicles and natural gas. The annual profits of Lama Group is said to be approximately 35MM Dollars.

References

External links 
 Plaza Lama

Supermarkets of the Dominican Republic
Santo Domingo
Retail companies established in 1929
1929 establishments in the Dominican Republic